= Zone Militaire =

- Type: Military news
- Language: French
- Website: opex360.com

Zone Militaire, published on the website Opex360, is a French online newspaper specializing in military and geopolitics, both in France and internationally. The site was established in 2007 and is run by Laurent Lagneau.

According to a 2017 IRSEM survey, the website was considered as one of the three main blogs in France's defense sector.

The website also hosts an online forum for military personnel.
